The one hundred kwacha note of Zambia is a denomination of the Zambian currency.
The current paper note, first issued in 2013 features the Freedom Statue in Lusaka, the issuing authority of legal tenders in Zambia, in the middle there is the National Assembly, the face value of the banknote in words in the lower left corner, and in numerals in the other three corners and the new printer imprint Giesecke & Devrient at the lower right corner, there is also a Buffalo on the reverse. The obverse features the African fish eagle which is considered as the primary recognition of the Zambian banknote, together with the coat of arms, the signature of the Bank of Zambia Governor and obligation to pay the sum indicated on the banknote, and the face value of the specified banknote and the Baobab Tree.
It is the highest denomination of banknote issued by the Bank of Zambia since January, 2013 when the three zeros from the preexisting denomination K500, K1,000, K5,000, K10,000, K20,000 and K50,000 were removed.

Removal of three zeros from the denomination
The old currency unit was divided by 1000, hence, removing three zeros from the preexisting K50,000, K20,000, K10,000, K5,000, and K1,000. The lower denominations of K500, K100, and K50 were also divided by 1000 and were changed into the 1 Kwacha, 50, 10, and 5 Ngwee coins respectively.
On January 23, 2012, the Bank of Zambia proposed certain measures in regards of the redenomination of the Zambian Kwacha. Such recommendations were initially approved by the government, being one of the measures required to address costs associated with the continuous devaluation of the national currency, due to depreciation throughout time, as a direct result of several years of high inflation rates that characterized the national economy during the late decades of the 20th century, and the early years of the 21st century. On 22 August 2012 the Bank of Zambia issued a press release stating that the changeover date for the rebased currency had been set as 1 January 2013.
The recommendations were assented to the parliament on November 3, 2012. Later, The Redomination of Currency Act (Act 8 of 2012) was enacted on December 3, 2012.

References

External links

 One Hundred Kwacha on Chalo Chatu

Banknotes of Zambia
One-hundred-base-unit banknotes